Mount Collins is a mountain in the Great Smoky Mountains, located in the Southeastern United States. Located along the Appalachian Trail between Clingmans Dome and Newfound Gap, the mountain is a popular destination for thru-hikers. A backcountry shelter and a major trail junction are located along the mountain's northeastern slope. The mountain's summit is located amidst the Southern Appalachian spruce-fir forest that covers much of the upper elevations in the central Smokies.

Like most of the Smokies crest, Mount Collins is situated along the Tennessee-North Carolina border, with Sevier County to the north and Swain County to the south. The mountain is the 25th-highest mountain in the Eastern United States, the 7th-highest in Tennessee, and the 10th-highest in the Great Smoky Mountains National Park.

Two major watersheds— Little River and the West Fork of the Little Pigeon River— have their sources high on the mountain's northern slopes. The former flows down to Townsend and drains the northwestern Smokies before emptying into the Little Tennessee River. The latter drains the north-central section of the park, flowing through the Sugarlands, Gatlinburg, Pigeon Forge, and Sevierville en route to the French Broad River.

Mount Collins is named after Robert Collins, an Oconaluftee resident who guided Arnold Guyot across the crest of the Smokies in the late 1850s. While originally named "Mount Collins", the mountain was known as "Meigs Post" throughout the late-19th century and early-20th century after a station constructed by Return Meigs near its summit. In 1931, Horace Kephart requested the mountain be named for him, but due to protests from Tennesseans (who favored their statesman Robert Collins over the North Carolinian Kephart), he settled on the mountain that now bears his name several miles to the east.

Hiking trails 
Several major trails intersect atop Mount Collins. The Sugarland Mountain Trail intersects the Appalachian Trail a few hundred meters from the summit, and connects the Smokies crest with the Sugarlands and Elkmont areas to the north. The Mountains-to-Sea Trail, which connects the crest of the Smokies with the Atlantic Ocean, also intersects the Appalachian Trail near the summit, just opposite the Sugarland Mountain Trail junction (this leg of the MST is called "Fork Ridge Trail" on park maps). The Noland Divide Trail descends Collins' south slope, connecting the Appalachian Trail to Bryson City, North Carolina. All of these trails can be accessed from Clingmans Dome Road, which is typically open between April 1 and December 1 (in winter, the A.T. can be accessed from U.S. Route 441 at Newfound Gap).

The Mount Collins Shelter is located along the Sugarland Mountain Trail, a half-mile north of the Appalachian Trail junction.  The shelter can accommodate 12 backpackers.

References

External links 
 Great Smoky Mountains National Park Trail Map - .pdf format
 Mount Collins - SummitPost.org
 South Beyond 6000 in the Smokies - Challenge sponsored by the Carolina Hiking Club and the Tennessee Eastman Hiking and Canoeing Club

Mountains of Great Smoky Mountains National Park
Mountains on the Appalachian Trail
Mountains of North Carolina
Mountains of Tennessee
Southern Sixers
Protected areas of Sevier County, Tennessee
Protected areas of Swain County, North Carolina
Mountains of Swain County, North Carolina
Mountains of Sevier County, Tennessee